Giuseppe Scienza (born 14 October 1966) is an Italian football manager and former player who played as a midfielder.

Playing career
Scienza played Serie A level for Reggiana, Torino and Piacenza. He retired in 2002 to pursue a career as a coach.

Coaching career
In 2011, following two stints at minor clubs Legnano and Viareggio, Scienza was named new head coach of Serie B club Brescia, guiding them until December of that year. He successively worked regularly at Serie C clubs, being in charge of teams such as Cremonese, FeralpiSalò and Alessandria. He then moved to Switzerland to guide Challenge League club FC Chiasso during the 2016–17 season.

In 2017 he took over at Serie C club Monopoli, which he coached for four seasons, apart from a short break in 2019. During his tenure at Monopoli, he achieved a third place by the end of the 2019–20 Serie C season, and consistently guiding the small Apulian club to the promotion playoffs.

On 23 June 2021, he joined Serie C club Pro Vercelli on a two-year contract. He was dismissed on 5 December 2021 following a string of negative results.

References

1966 births
Living people
Italian footballers
Association football midfielders
Torino F.C. players
S.S.D. Puteolana 1902 Internapoli players
Calcio Foggia 1920 players
Catania S.S.D. players
Reggina 1914 players
A.C. Reggiana 1919 players
Venezia F.C. players
Piacenza Calcio 1919 players
A.C. Cesena players
A.S.D. Castel di Sangro Calcio players
Aurora Pro Patria 1919 players
Serie A players
Serie B players
Italian football managers
Torino F.C. non-playing staff
A.C. Legnano managers
Brescia Calcio managers
U.S. Cremonese managers
U.S. Alessandria Calcio 1912 managers
FC Chiasso managers
F.C. Pro Vercelli 1892 managers
Serie C managers
Italian expatriate football managers
Expatriate football managers in Switzerland
Italian expatriate sportspeople in Switzerland